Intercourse Island is an uninhabited island in the Dampier Archipelago, in the Pilbara region of Western Australia.

It is about 1,300km north of the state capital Perth.

Although Intercourse Island and its surrounding area are almost uninhabited, with a density of less than two people per square kilometre, it is located in a major minerals export area. The climate conditions in the area are arid. The average annual rainfall is 409 millimeters. The wettest month is January, with an average of 148mm of precipitation, and the driest is August, with 1mm of precipitation.

Nearby islands
 Mistaken Island
 Haycock Island (Western Australia)
 East Lewis Island
 East Intercourse Island
 East Mid Intercourse Island
 West Mid Intercourse Island
 West Intercourse Island

References

Dampier Archipelago
Uninhabited islands of Australia